Elkwater Lake is a small lake located in the northwest corner of the Cypress Hills Interprovincial Park in southeastern Alberta, Canada. It is reached via Alberta Highway 41 (Buffalo Trail), and the tourist community of Elkwater lies on its southern shore.  Its name is a translation of Ponokiokwe, the Blackfoot name for the lake.

It is a mesotrophic lake, and it hosts a fishery  for Yellow Perch and Northern Pike.

Geologically, Elkwater Lake sits in a glacial meltwater valley that was carved during the retreat of the Laurentide Ice Sheet from the area at the end of the Pleistocene Epoch.

See also
Lakes of Alberta
Cypress Hills

References

Cypress County
Lakes of Alberta